Williston Basin International Airport  is an airport serving Williston, a city in the U.S. state of North Dakota. It is located 9 nautical miles (17km) northwest of the city.

Williston Basin Airport has two runways and a  terminal building. It was built to replace Sloulin Field International Airport, which previously served Williston and had experienced difficulty dealing with the increase in air traffic to Williston amid the North Dakota oil boom. The airport opened to the public on October 10, 2019.

History
The airport previously serving Williston was Sloulin Field International Airport. Sloulin Field Airport dealt with design concerns, constraints on expansion, and the need for runway works. In addition, the airport had difficulty coping with a significant rise in air traffic amid the North Dakota oil boom.

In 2011, officials began to consider either making renovations to Sloulin Field or building a new airport. The cost of refurbishments was less than that of constructing a new airport; however, officials determined that building a new airport was the cheaper option. Not having to limit air service to Williston during construction at Sloulin Field would save revenue, and the city would gain from decommissioning the old airport and selling the land. The total cost of the project was $240 million, which was paid by the FAA, the state of North Dakota, and the city of Williston.

A groundbreaking ceremony took place on October 10, 2016, with several members of the state government in attendance. Procedural and weather-related problems delayed the start of construction to mid-2017. The airport opened to the public on October 10, 2019, with short-haul service to Minneapolis/St. Paul by Delta Connection and Denver by United Express. Shortly after the airport's opening, both carriers began using larger regional jets accommodating up to 76 passengers on some flights as compared to smaller 50-seat planes used previously in Williston.

Infrastructure
A crosswind runway, 4/22, which measures , was opened on November 5, 2020 and is mainly intended for use by smaller aircraft.

The terminal occupies  and has four gates, three of which have jet bridges. It can handle up to 350,000 passengers annually.

In June 2020, there were 49 aircraft based at this airport: 42 single-engine, 5 multi-engine, and 2 helicopter. Currently, the FAA does not have any published aircraft operations data for this airport.

Access
A  road was built to connect the airport to the U.S. Route 85 truck bypass.

Airlines and destinations

Passenger 

Delta Connection uses CRJ200s operated by SkyWest Airlines to Minneapolis. Sun Country Airlines uses Boeing 737-800s to Las Vegas. United Express uses CRJ200s operated by SkyWest Airlines to Denver.

Cargo

Statistics

Carrier shares

Top destinations

References

External links
 

Airports in North Dakota
Buildings and structures in Williams County, North Dakota
Transportation in Williams County, North Dakota
Williston, North Dakota
Airports established in 2019